Lynne Overman (September 19, 1887  – February 19, 1943) was an American actor. Born in Maryville, Missouri, he began his career in theatre before becoming a film actor in the 1930s and early 1940s. In films he often played a sidekick.

Early in Overman's career, he sang in musical comedies, but he left that genre after a severe cold and an operation on his throat affected his larynx. His credits on Broadway included The Budget (1932), Hot-Cha! (1932), Company's Coming (1931), Dancing Partner (1930), Button, Button (1929), Sunny Days (1928), People Don't Do Such Things (1927), The Gossipy Sex (1927), Just Married (1921), Honey Girl (1920), Come-on Charlie (1919), and Fair and Warmer (1916). He also performed in London in Just Married, The Hottentot, and Little Accident.

His film debut came in Little Miss Marker (1934).

Partial filmography

 The Perfect Crime (1928) - Newlywed (uncredited)
 Midnight (1934) - Joe Biggers
 Little Miss Marker (1934) - Regret
 The Great Flirtation (1934) - Joe Lang
 She Loves Me Not (1934) - Gus McNeal
 You Belong to Me (1934) - Brown - Theatre Manager
 Broadway Bill (1934) - Oscar 'Happy' McGuire
 Enter Madame (1935) - Mr. Farnum
 Rumba (1935) - Flash
 Paris in Spring (1935) - DuPont
 Men Without Names (1935) - Gabby Lambert
 Two for Tonight (1935) - Harry
 Collegiate (1936) - Sour-Puss
 Poppy (1936) - Attorney Eddie G. Whiffen
 Yours for the Asking (1936) - Honeysuckle
 Three Married Men (1936) - Jeff Mullins
 The Jungle Princess  (1936) - Frank
 Don't Tell the Wife (1937) - Steven A. 'Steve' Dorsey
 Murder Goes to College (1937) - Henry 'Hank' Hyer
 Nobody's Baby (1937) - Det. Lt. Emory Littleworth
 Hotel Haywire (1937) - Dr. Parkhouse
 Wild Money (1937) - Perry Brown
 Blonde Trouble (1937) - Joe Hart
 Partners in Crime (1937) - Hank Hyer
 Night Club Scandal (1937) - Russell Kirk - Reporter
 True Confession (1937) - Bartender
 The Big Broadcast of 1938 (1938) - Scoop McPhail
 Her Jungle Love (1938) - Jimmy Wallace
 Hunted Men (1938) - Peter Harris
 Men with Wings (1938) - Hank Rinebow
 Spawn of the North (1938) - 'Jack' Jackson
 Sons of the Legion (1938) - Charles Lee
 Ride a Crooked Mile (1938) - Oklahoma
 Persons in Hiding (1939) - Agent Pete Griswold
 Union Pacific (1939) - Leach Overmile
 Death of a Champion (1939) - Oliver Quade
 Typhoon (1940) - Skipper Joe
 Edison, the Man (1940) - Bunt Cavatt
 Safari (1940) - Jock McPhail
 Northwest Mounted Police (1940) - Tod McDuff
 The Hard-Boiled Canary (1941) - George Thomas
 Caught in the Draft (1941) - Steve Riggs
 Aloma of the South Seas (1941) - Corky
 New York Town (1941) - Sam
 Roxie Hart (1942) - Jake Callahan
 Reap the Wild Wind (1942) - Captain Phillip Philpott
 The Forest Rangers (1942) - Jammer Jones
 Silver Queen (1942) - Hector Bailey
 Star Spangled Rhythm (1942) - Mark in Card Playing Skit
 Dixie (1943) - Mr. Whitlock
 The Desert Song (1943) - Johnny Walsh (final film role)

References

External links
 
 
 

1887 births
1943 deaths
Male actors from Missouri
American male film actors
People from Maryville, Missouri
Burials at Woodlawn Memorial Cemetery, Santa Monica
20th-century American male actors
American male stage actors